Shinnecock Hills was a rail station located along the Montauk Branch of the Long Island Rail Road and first opened around 1887 on the south side of the tracks, and closed in 1938.

The name was revived for the former Southampton Campus station for the 2004 and 2018 U.S. Open at the nearby Shinnecock Hills Golf Club.

The building was used as a U.S. Post Office and was a private residence as of 2013. In October 2013, it was dedicated as a Southampton Town Historic Landmark.

References

External links
Shinnecock Hills Station Image (Existing Railroad Stations in New York State)
Shinnecock Hills Station in the 1960s and 1973 (WorldNYCSubway.org)

Former Long Island Rail Road stations in Suffolk County, New York
Railway stations in the United States opened in 1887
Railway stations closed in 1932
Historic sites in New York (state)
Southampton (town), New York
1887 establishments in New York (state)